Henry Chancellor may refer to:

 Henry Chancellor (politician) (1863–1945), radical British Liberal Party politician
 Henry Chancellor (filmmaker) (born 1968), British television director, producer, and writer